Perico, once known as Farwell, is a ghost town on U.S. Route 87 in Dallam County, Texas, United States.

As late as 1980, the town had a business, a grain elevator and two known residents.

References

External links 
 Perico, Texas on Ghosttowns.com

Geography of Dallam County, Texas
Ghost towns in the Texas Panhandle